The African Men's classification is a men's classification, the one by which the best African men's team of the Cape Epic is determined. Since 2018, the leader of the African Men's classification wears the Absa African Men's Special Jersey. Matthys Beukes won the jersey 5 times. Three out of this fives with his partner Philip Buys.

Winners

Statistics

By rider

By duo

By nationality

References

External links
Past-winners

Cape Epic classifications and awards
Cycling jerseys